An election of the delegation from West Germany to the European Parliament was held in 1984.

Results

West Berlin, due to its special status, was ineligible to participate in the election. Instead, the city legislature indirectly elected three members:

References

West Germany
European Parliament elections in Germany
1984 elections in Germany
1984 in West Germany